Air Commodore William Edward George Mann CB, CBE, DFC (20 April 1899 – 4 May 1966) was a senior officer in the Royal Air Force and a flying ace of the First World War credited with thirteen confirmed aerial victories. In later years, he specialized in signals and communications work, and was instrumental in developing mobile radars and signal units for the RAF in the Second World War.

After his retirement from military service, Mann became the Director of Telecommunications of the Ministry of Civil Aviation from 1948 to 1950. He then became Director-General of Civil Aviation Navigational Services until his final retirement in 1959.

First World War
Mann began his military career as a Sopwith Camel pilot in the Royal Naval Air Service in 1917. It took him several months before he was successful, but from 8 May through 26 September 1918, he scored thirteen aerial victories while with 208 Squadron (formerly 8 Naval). His final tally was six German planes destroyed (including two shared victories), and seven more driven down out of control.

Aerial victory list

Interbellum
Mann spent a period of unemployment for some months as the new Royal Air Force downsized and reorganized. He spent 1920 in various instructor training courses. In 1921, he participated in the second Hendon Air Pageant; he also served on the Central Flying School's five man aerobatic team flying Sopwith Snipes along with Arthur Coningham. Mann would return to this team in 1924. They were the first to fly an inverted formation at Hendon.

Beginning 10 January 1926, he attended Electrical and Wireless School. Signals would become his specialty for the remainder of his career. He attended the RAF Staff College, Andover, beginning the course on 21 January 1936, before shipping out to the Middle East.

Second World War
Mann continued to serve in the Mid East and Mediterranean; he helped develop mobile radar and signals units that served as models for the entire RAF. He served through the war, retiring on 18 April 1945.

Later life
Mann's expertise in signals took him into civil service on familiar ground. He became the Civil Aviation Signals representative in Cairo, starting in 1945. He moved on to become the Director of Telecommunications of the Ministry of Civil Aviation from 1948 to 1950. He then became Director-General of Civil Aviation Navigational Services until his second retirement in 1959. He would spend the next two years representing the Decca Navigator Company before returning to England.

Mann died on 4 May 1966.

Promotions in rank
 Temporary Sub-Lieutenant: 12 August 1917
 Second lieutenant: 1 April 1918
 Lieutenant: Unknown date (seniority from 1 April 1918)
 Temporary Captain and Flight commander: 27 August 1918
 Flying officer: 1 August 1919 (seniority of 1 April 1918)
–Transferred to Unemployed List on 27 August 1919–
 Flying officer: 2 January 1920 (seniority of 1 April 1918)
 Flight lieutenant: 1 July 1924
 Squadron leader: 1 December 1934
 Wing Commander: 1 July 1938
 Temporary Group Captain: 1 December 1940
 Temporary Air Commodore: 1 December 1943

Honours and awards
Companion of the Order of the Bath: 2 January 1956
Commander of the Order of the British Empire: 1942
Distinguished Flying Cross: 3 December 1918
Mentioned in Dispatches: 14 January 1944; 24 September 1941
Officer of the Legion of Merit: 10 March 1944
Member of the Institution of Electrical Engineers

References

Bibliography
 

1899 births
1966 deaths
British World War I flying aces
Commanders of the Order of the British Empire
Companions of the Order of the Bath
Recipients of the Distinguished Flying Cross (United Kingdom)
Officers of the Legion of Merit
Royal Air Force air commodores
Royal Air Force personnel of World War I
Royal Air Force personnel of World War II
Military personnel from London